Stony Point is an unincorporated community in Bourbon County, Kentucky, in the United States.

History
Stony Point was a station on the Kentucky Central Railroad. A post office was established at Stony Point in 1858, and remained in operation until it was discontinued in 1892.

References

Unincorporated communities in Bourbon County, Kentucky
Unincorporated communities in Kentucky